Dr. Cynthia Aaron Glassman of Alexandria, Virginia was a commissioner of the U.S. Securities and Exchange Commission (SEC) as well as the Under Secretary for Economic Affairs.

She served as acting chair from July 1, 2005 to August 3, 2005. She received a Ph.D. in economics from the University of Pennsylvania in 1975.

External links
 SEC biography

References

Year of birth missing (living people)
Living people
Fellows of Lucy Cavendish College, Cambridge
Members of the U.S. Securities and Exchange Commission
United States Department of Commerce officials
People from Alexandria, Virginia
Wellesley College alumni
George W. Bush administration personnel